Jeremy Keith Burdett (July 1, 1947 – June 23, 1997), or Jeremy K. Burdett, was a British-American chemist known for his work on bridging the gap between molecular science and solid state chemistry from an electron orbital viewpoint.

Education and career 
Burdett was a native of London, UK. He studied at the Magdalene College, University of Cambridge, receiving his bachelor's degree in 1968 in natural sciences with a specialization in chemistry. He obtained a master's degree from the University of Michigan in 1970 and worked as a Power Foundation Fellow with Jerry Current. He return to University of Cambridge and received a Ph.D. in 1972 under the supervision of Jim J. Turner. Subsequently, Burdett moved to Newcastle University along with Jim J. Turner's group and was appointed senior research officer. In 1977, Burdett spent a sabbatical at Cornell University with Roald Hoffmann, who greatly influenced Burdett's research direction. In 1978, Burdett joined the faculty at the University of Chicago, where he spent the rest of his career.

Honors and awards 
Burdett received the following accolades during his career,
 Meldola Medals of the Royal Society of Chemistry (1977) along with Martyn Poliakoff
 Alfred P. Sloan Foundation Fellow (1979)
 Camille and Henry Dreyfus Foundation Teacher Scholar
 Fellow of the John Simon Guggenheim Memorial Foundation (1990)
 Wilsmore Fellow of the University of Melbourne (1985)
 CNRS Visiting Professor at the Universite de Paris-Sud, Orsay (1987) and at University of Rennes 1 (1994)
 Tilden Medal and Prize of the Royal Society of Chemistry (1995).

Personal life 
Burdett's first wife was Wendy Greenwood, with whom he had two sons, Rufus and Harry.   Burdett passed away at his summer home in Kalamazoo, Michigan after attending a conference in Ann Arbor, Michigan.

Bibliography

Reviews

Books

References 

1947 births
1997 deaths
Alumni of the University of Cambridge
University of Michigan alumni
University of Chicago faculty
Academics of Newcastle University
Cornell University people
British chemists
Sloan Fellows
Theoretical chemists